Chauncey is both a given name and a surname. Notable people with the name "Chauncey" include:

Given name

A
Chauncey Abbott (1815–1872), American lawyer and politician
Chauncey M. Abbott (1822–1863), American politician

B
Chauncey Bailey (1949–2007), American journalist
Chauncey Brooke Baker (1860–1936), American army officer
Chauncey Bangs (1901–1942), Canadian skater
Chauncey Beadle (1866–1950), Canadian botanist 
Chauncey L. Berrien (1879–1932), American football player
Chauncey Billups (born 1976), American basketball player
Chauncey Bishop (1882–1927), American football player
Chauncey Forward Black (1839–1904), American politician
Chauncey Samuel Boucher (1886–1955), American historian
Chauncey Boughton (1805–1895), American physician and politician
Chauncey B. Brewster (1848–1941), American bishop
Chauncey W. Brownell (1847–1938), American attorney and politician
Chauncey Browning Sr. (1903–1971), American judge 
Chauncey H. Browning Jr. (1934–2010), American attorney and politician
Chauncey Bulkley (1798–1860), American lawyer
Chauncey Burkam (1892–1964), American baseball player

C
Chauncey G. Cady (1803–1893), American farmer and politician
Chauncey C. Churchill (1815–1889), American civil servant
Chauncey Fitch Cleveland (1799–1887), American politician
Chauncey Colton (1800–1876), American educator
Chauncey H. Cooke (1846–1919), American soldier and teacher

D
Chauncey Davis (born 1983), American football player
Chauncey Davis (politician) (1812–1888), American politician
Chauncey Depew (1834–1928), American attorney and politician

E
Chauncey Eskridge (1917–1988), American attorney

F
Chauncey Ives Filley (1829–1923), American politician 
Chauncey Fisher (1872–1939), American baseball player 
Chauncey Forward (1793–1839), American politician
Chauncey J. Fox (1797–1883), American politician

G
Chauncey H. Griffith (1879–1956), American print designer
Chauncey Golston (born 1998), American football player
Chauncey Goodrich (1759–1815), American lawyer and politician
Chauncey A. Goodrich (1790–1860), American clergyman
Chauncey Wright Griggs (1832–1910), American businessman and politician

H
Chauncey B. Hammond (1882–1952), American politician
Chauncey Hardy (1988–2011), American basketball player
Chauncey Hare (1934–2019), American photographer
Chauncey Hawkins (born 1975), American rapper
Chauncey Heath (disambiguation), multiple people
Chauncey L. Higbee (1821–1884), American politician
Chauncey Hollis (born 1987), American record producer
Chauncey Marvin Holt (1921–1997), American social figure
Chauncey Hosford (1820–1911), American pioneer
Chauncey Howell (1935–2021), American newscaster

I
Chauncey Ives (1810–1894), American sculptor

J
Chauncey Jerome (1793–1868), American clockmaker

K
Chauncey Kirby (1871–1950), Canadian ice hockey player
Chauncey L. Knapp (1809–1898), American politician

L
Chauncey Langdon (1763–1830), American politician
Chauncey D. Leake (1896–1978), American pharmacologist
Chauncey Leopardi (born 1981), American actor
Chauncey B. Little (1877–1952), American politician 
Chauncey Loomis (1783–1817), American politician
Chauncey C. Loomis (1930–2009), American writer

M
Chauncey McCormick (1884–1954), American businessman
Chauncey McPherson (1892–1977), American fencer
Chauncey Morehouse (1902–1980), American jazz drummer

N
Chauncey Nye (1823–1900), American pioneer

O
Chauncey O'Toole (born 1986), Canadian rugby union footballer
Chauncey Olcott (1858–1932), American actor
Chauncey N. Olds (1816–1890), American politician

P
Chauncey Parker, American attorney
Chauncey M. Phelps (1818–1868), American politician
Chauncey Hatch Phillips (1837–1902), American real-estate developer 
Chauncey Northrop Pond (1841–1920), American minister
Chauncey Purple (1820–1882), American businessman

R
Chauncey W. Reed (1890–1956), American politician
Chauncey Rivers (born 1997), American football player
Chauncey Rose (1794–1877), American businessman
Chauncey Foster Ryder (1868–1949), American painter

S
Chauncey Brewer Sabin (1824–1890), American federal judge
Chauncey S. Sage (1816–1890), American businessman and politician
Chauncey B. Seaton (1848–1896), American architect
Chauncey Simpson (1901–1970), American football coach
Chauncey Fitch Skilling (1868–1945), American architect
Chauncey Sparks (1884–1968), American attorney and politician
Chauncey Starr (1912–2007), American electrical engineer
Chauncey Steele (disambiguation), multiple people
Chauncey Hugh Stigand (1877–1919), British army officer
Chauncey Stillman (1907–1989), American military officer
Chauncey Guy Suits (1905–1991), American physicist

T
Chauncey Thomas (1813–1882), American farmer and businessman
Chauncey Thomas Jr. (1850–1919), American naval officer 
Chauncey Brewster Tinker (1876–1963), American scholar

V
Chauncey Vibbard (1811–1891), American railroad executive
Chauncey Milton Vought (1890–1930), American aviator

W
Chauncey Washington (born 1985), American football player
Chauncey B. Welton (1844–1908), American businessman and politician
Chauncey W. West (1827–1870), American missionary
Chauncey Westbrook (1921–2006), American guitarist
Chauncey Pratt Williams (1860–1936), American historian
Chauncey Wright (1830–1875), American philosopher

Y
Chauncey Yellow Robe (1867–??), Native American educator
Chauncey W. Yockey (1877–1936), American lawyer and politician

Surname
Charles Chauncey (disambiguation), multiple people
Danny Chauncey (born 1956), American guitarist
George Chauncey (born 1954), American historian and writer 
George Chauncey (executive) (1847–1926), American businessman
Henry Chauncey (1905–2002), American educator
Ichabod Chauncey (1635–1691), English physician and nonconformist divine
Isaac Chauncey (1779–1840), American naval officer
Leslie Chauncey (born 1981), American basketball player
Richard Chauncey (??–1760), English merchant
Sam Chauncey, American university administrator

See also
Chauncy (name)
Chauncey (disambiguation)